Camp Stanley is a former U.S. Army military camp located just east of the city of Uijeongbu, South Korea. The camp is part of the Red Cloud Garrison which is composed of Army installations near the Korean Demilitarized Zone (DMZ).

Camp Stanley began as a tent city in 1954. The first U.S. Army helicopters moved to the camp later that year and aviation units were stationed there until 2nd ID's relocation in August 2005. Various 2nd ID units operated out of the camp from 1971 through 2005. The camp was home to both 2nd ID's Division Artillery and Aviation units until base realignment handed command of the installation to the 501st Corps Support Group.

History
Camp Stanley began as a tent city in 1954. The first U.S. Army helicopters moved to the camp later that year and aviation units were stationed there until 2nd ID's relocation in August 2005. Various 2nd ID units operated out of the camp from 1971 through 2005. The camp was home to both 2nd ID's Division Artillery and Aviation units until base realignment handed command of the installation to the 501st Corps Support Group.

Status
Camp Stanley was home to the following tenant units and groups: Charlie Company 2nd Aviation Regiment (AMC), C2AMC, 6-37 Field Artillery, Foxtrot Battery(TAB)/26th FA, 304th Signal Battalion (HHC, Bravo, and Charlie Companies), 532nd Military Intelligence Battation (Bravo Company), 46th Transportation Company 61st Maintenance Company (194th CSSB), 560th Medical Company, Installation Management Command (IMCOM), 602nd Aviation Support Battalion (Support Team), MEDDAC-K Preventive Medicine &  Industrial Hygiene, 23rd Chemical Battalion (2ID), 618th Dental Company, 629th Ambulance Company, 560th Medical Company (TMC), Battery F/5th ADA, 55th Military Police Company, Numerous American Civilians, Korean National (KN), Korean Service Guards (KSG), and Korean Service Corps (KSC), 8/8 FA Battalion (2ID), DIV Arty (2ID)..

Warrior Reception Company (WRC) relocated to Camp Hovey in February 2012, as did the area Combined Issue Facility (CIF). 

Camp Stanley provides logistical support to Area I through its 501st SBDE units. The camp maintains its helipads and a refueling station for helicopters in support of 2nd Infantry Division operations, USFK and ROK. 

There is a HazMart (recycling and reutilization facility) on the camp.

Camp Stanley is slated to close by the end of 2017 with units leaving in June, in line with the ongoing draw-down and realignment of American forces in South Korea. Units that are not inactivated will relocate North to Camp Casey, or South to Camp Humphreys or Daegu Garrison.

Facilities

Health care
Dental Clinic
Troop Medical Clinic
Preventive Medicine & Industrial Hygiene

MWR
Community Activity Center (Closed)
Library
Bowling Center
Indoor Swimming Pool (Closed)
Tennis/Basketball Courts
Softball/Baseball Field
Gymnasium
Fitness Center
Bar and Restaurant, Reggies (Closed)

AAFES facilities 
Post Exchange
LG UPlus (Mobile, Internet, Cable TV service)
Commissary
Anthony's Pizza
Tailor Shop
Souvenir Shop
Coin and Plaque Shop
Electronics Shop
Internet and cellular phone shop
Pizza Delivery (Bowling Alley and Anthony's)
Barber / Beauty Salon
KATUSA Snack Bar (Korean food)

Noteworthy events
In July 2009 a South Korean court convicted six Korean nationals on charges of stealing $8 million in merchandise from the camp's Army and Air Force Exchange Service (AAFES) stores between October 2005 and September 2006. Five of those were former employees of AAFES at the base.

Camp Stanley is officially closed and is no longer inhabited by the United States, RoK, or any other military entity.

See also 
 List of United States Army installations in South Korea

References

External links

redcloud.korea.army.mil, official website of USAG Area I, Camp Red Cloud, Camp Casey & Camp Stanley, Korea
Photos of Camp Stanley
KORO website.
Camp Stanley Veterans Association on Facebook

Buildings and structures in Uijeongbu
Closed installations of the United States Army
Stanley, Camp